Odostomia limpida is a species of minute sea snail, a marine gastropod mollusc or micromollusk in the family Pyramidellidae, the pyrams and their allies.

Description
The slender shell is elongate-conic, semitranslucent and  shining. It measures 3.6 mm. The nuclear whorls are moderately large, almost completely obliquely immersed in the first of the succeeding whorls; the peripheral edge only of the last volution is visible above this. The six post-nuclear whorls are situated rather high between the sutures, slightly rounded (almost flattened), faintly shouldered at the summit, apparently without axial or spiral sculpture. The whorls are feebly angulated at the periphery, and the summits of succeeding turns fall a little anterior to it, which renders the sutures well impressed. The base of the body whorl is large, rounded, very narrowly umbilicated. The aperture is large, subovate, somewhat produced at the junction of the outer lip and columella. The posterior angle is acute. The outer lip is thin. The columella slender, decidedly curved and somewhat revolute, provided with a prominent lamellar fold at its insertion. The parietal wall is covered by a thin callus.

Distribution
This species occurs in the Pacific Ocean off Japan and Vietnam.

References

External links
 Systax : Odostomia limpida
 OBIS : Odostomia limpida

limpida
Molluscs of Japan
Invertebrates of Vietnam
Gastropods described in 1906